Miyaoka is a Japanese surname. Notable people with the surname include:

, Japanese mathematician
, Japanese mathematician

Japanese-language surnames